Baculentulus africanus is a species of proturan in the family Acerentomidae. It is found in Africa.

References

Further reading

 

Protura
Articles created by Qbugbot
Animals described in 1976